The 2012 FIM Dansk Metal Nordic Speedway Grand Prix was the eleventh race of the 2012 Speedway Grand Prix season. It took place on 22 September at the Speedway Center in Vojens, Denmark.

The Grand Prix was won by wild card Michael Jepsen Jensen who beat Nicki Pedersen, Emil Sayfutdinov and Jason Crump in the final.

Riders 
The Speedway Grand Prix Commission nominated Michael Jepsen Jensen as Wild Card, and Kim Nilsson and Linus Sundström both as Track Reserves. Injured Kenneth Bjerre was replaced by second Qualified Substitutes, Krzysztof Kasprzak. First Qualified Substitutes, Martin Vaculík, had problems with blood pressure. The draw was made on 21 September.
 (7)  Kenneth Bjerre → (20)  Krzysztof Kasprzak

Results

Heat details

Heat after heat 
 (57,83) Lindbäck, Holder, Sayfutdinov, Hancock
 (58,53) N.Pedersen, Crump, Andersen, Gollob
 (59,50) Kasprzak, Harris, Lindgren, Hampel
 (59,00) Ljung, B.Pedersen, Jensen, Jonsson (R)
 (57,79) N.Pedersen, Jonsson, Holder, Hampel
 (58,46) Hancock, Andersen, Jensen, Kasprzak
 (58,44) Lindbäck, Lindgren, Gollob, B.Pedersen
 (59,63) Sayfutdinov, Crump, Ljung, Harris (X)
 (58,44) Holder, Ljung, Lindgren, Andersen
 (59,12) N.Pedersen, Hancock, B.Pedersen, Harris
 (59,11) Crump, Jensen, Lindbäck, Hampel
 (59,47) Gollob, Sayfutdinov, Jonsson, Kasprzak (X)
 (59,62) Jensen, Gollob, Holder, Harris
 (58,84) Lindgren, Hancock, Jonsson, Crump (R)
 (59,34) Lindbäck, N.Pedersen, Kasprzak, Ljung
 (59,75) Sayfutdinov, B.Pedersen, Andersen, Hampel
 (59,03) Holder, B.Pedersen, Crump, Kasprzak (R)
 (59,37) Hampel, Hancock, Gollob, Ljung (R)
 (59,53) Jonsson, Andersen, Lindbäck, Harris
 (59,83) Lindgren, N.Pedersen, Sayfutdinov, Jensen
 Semifinals
 (59,10) N.Pedersen, Crump, Lindgren, Hancock
 (59,69) Sayfutdinov, Jensen, Holder, Lindbäck
 the Final
 (59,64) Jensen, Pedersen, Sayfutdinov, Crump

The intermediate classification

References

See also 
 motorcycle speedway

Denmark
2012
2012 in Danish motorsport